Calhoun Falls is a town in Abbeville County, South Carolina, United States. The population was 1,724 at the 2020 census, down from 2,004 at the 2010 census.

The town derives its name from John E. Colhoun (or Calhoun), a United States Senator from South Carolina.

Geography
Calhoun Falls is located at  (34.092870, -82.589746).

The Calhoun Falls State Recreation Area is located nearby. Calhoun Falls State Park, a South Carolina state park, is within ; and Bobby Brown State Park, a Georgia state park, is within .

Calhoun Falls is situated at the junction of two major South Carolina state highways: South Carolina Highway 72 and South Carolina Highway 81. The former links the town with Elberton, Georgia, Athens, Georgia, and ultimately Atlanta to the west; and Abbeville, Greenwood, and ultimately metro Charlotte to the east. The latter links the town with Anderson to the north and McCormick to the south. Highway 72 has recently been re-routed around downtown Calhoun Falls as a four-lane 45-mph bypass.

Education
There are two public schools in Calhoun Falls: John C. Calhoun Elementary School and Calhoun Falls Charter School. The latter was founded in 2008. Before this, the only high school in  town was Calhoun Falls High School, part of the Abbeville County School District, which closed it because of budget cuts. Calhoun Falls Charter School was started by the local town leaders and is in the same building as the former Calhoun Falls High School.

Demographics

2020 census

As of the 2020 United States census, there were 1,727 people, 742 households, and 417 families residing in the town.

2000 census
At the 2000 census, there were 2,303 people, 908 households, and 640 families residing in the town. The population density was 731.9 people per square mile (282.3/km2). There were 1,042 housing units at an average density of 331.2 per square mile (127.7/km2). The racial makeup of the town was 45.25% White, 52.67% African American, 0.04% Native American, 0.09% Asian, 0.13% Pacific Islander, 0.52% from other races, and 1.30% from two or more races. Hispanic or Latino of any race were 1.74% of the population.

There were 908 households, of which 33.4% had children under the age of 18 living with them, 40.5% were married couples living together, 24.3% had a female householder with no husband present, and 29.5% were non-families. 27.1% of all households were made up of individuals, and 13.0% had someone living alone who was 65 years of age or older. The average household size was 2.52 and the average family size was 3.05.

27.7% of the population were under the age of 18, 8.9% from 18 to 24, 26.8% from 25 to 44, 22.7% from 45 to 64, and 13.9% who were 65 years of age or older. The median age was 36 years. For every 100 females, there were 88.9 males. For every 100 females age 18 and over, there were 83.1 males.

The median household income was $21,728 and the median family income was $30,573. Males had a median income of $26,359 compared with $19,914 for females. The per capita income for the town was $10,412. About 18.4% of families and 23.5% of the population were below the poverty line, including 21.5% of those under age 18 and 34.5% of those age 65 or over.

Education
Calhoun Falls has a public library, a branch of the Abbeville County Library System.

Notable people

 Kelly Bryant, quarterback for Missouri Tigers
 Martavis Bryant, Oakland Raiders wide receiver
 Neil Chrisley, Major League Baseball outfielder

See also
Georgia–Carolina Memorial Bridge

References

External links
 South Carolina Route 72 Case Study, a Federal Highway Administration article on the impact of the Highway 72 project in and around Calhoun Falls.
 Calhoun Falls State Park
 

Towns in Abbeville County, South Carolina
Towns in South Carolina